Emmanuel d'Alzon (August 30, 1810 – November 21, 1880) was a leading figure of the Catholic Church in France in the 19th century.

Biography

Early years
He was born the oldest of four children, in Le Vigan, Gard, in southern France, to an aristocratic and intensely Catholic family from the Cévennes Mountains.

In 1816 the family moved to the family château of Lavagnac (Hérault) where d'Alzon received his early education at home at the hands of tutors. From 1823 to 1828 d'Alzon studied at the renowned Parisian colleges of Lycée Louis-le-Grand and Collège Stanislas de Paris. It was at the end of his secondary studies that he came into contact with the influential thinker, Félicité de Lamennais, much of whose early teachings on the political order and Christian society would mark the young d'Alzon. In 1828 d'Alzon enrolled in law school in Paris but never finished because of the political upheavals which struck France in 1830. During these years in the French capital he had come to know a host of distinguished young men, some of whom remained friends throughout his life, Henri Lacordaire, who would re-establish the Dominican order in France, Olympe Philippe Gerbet, founder of La Revue catholique, noted preacher Théodore Combalot, and Count Charles de Montalembert, journalist, historian, and politician. According to George Tavard, "It was influence of Bonald, Joseph de Maistre and Lamennais that made the later d'Alzon a determined opponent of the Gallican party at the First Vatican Council."

Middle years

In 1832 d'Alzon, against the wishes of his parents since he was an only son of a noble family, decided to enter the diocesan seminary of Montpellier. However, the following year, disappointed by the lack of ambition of the students and the lack of depth of the course work, he went to Rome where he stayed until 1835. In Rome he completed his theological studies by seeking out outstanding tutors such as the Capuchin Cardinal Micara, the Dominican Fr. Olivieri, soon to become master-general of the order, Nicholas Wiseman, the Englishman who would be named a cardinal, Fr. Ventura, superior general of the Theatines, and Fr. Mazzetti, an influential Carmelite. On 26 December 1834, he was ordained at the age of twenty-four. He continued studies until May of the following year.

Upon his return to France he opted to join the diocese of Nîmes, where his uncle, Liron d'Airolles, was a priest. D'Alzon's early years in ministry were dedicated to confronting Protestants, who made up a third of the local population, and to numerous initiatives such as the founding of youth groups, a home for unwed mothers, libraries for workers, and innumerable retreats, conferences, and sermons. By 1839 he was appointed vicar general of the diocese, a position he held until 1878, two years before his death. All of his endeavors carried the stamp of his ultramontanism (defense of the sovereignty of the Pope in religious matters).

In 1843 one of his most cherished dreams became a reality: he acquired a secondary school, Collège de l'Assomption, in Nìmes, where he hoped to form upper-class students to enter society as Catholic agents of change in a traditionalist mode. With this purchase began one of the greatest struggles of d'Alzon's life, a fight to obtain free and full exercise of private education in the face of state monopoly. It was at this institution that in 1845, spurred along by his lifelong friend and collaborator, Mother Marie-Eugénie de Jésus, foundress of the Religious of the Assumption, he founded an order of men, the Augustinians of the Assumption, also known as the Assumptionists. In his own words the purpose of this order was "to work toward our perfection by extending the reign of Jesus Christ in souls", especially through "education, publication of books, works of charity, retreats, and the foreign missions" (First Constitutions, 1855). He placed his congregation under the guidance of St. Augustine, giving it his name, his rule, and his intellectual tradition.

Later Years
A frequent visitor to Rome, d'Alzon had a meeting with Pope Pius IX in 1862 that would have a profound effect on him and his young congregation. Encouraged by the pope, he visited Constantinople and soon thereafter decided to invest much of his time, energy, and resources in addressing the needs of the Church in Eastern Europe. As with his concerns to convert Protestants, d'Alzon wished to win back Orthodox Christians to Rome, so profound was his desire for the unity of Church, as he saw it. Within a few years he had sent some of his first religious to Bulgaria and eventually to Romania and Turkey (after his death communities would be established in the Holy Land, Russia, Greece, and Yugoslavia). In 1865 he founded a congregation of religious women, the Oblates of the Assumption, to assist the Assumptionists in the foreign missions, especially in Eastern Europe. At the same time he continued his efforts in France to promote freedom of exercise for private Catholic schools and dreamed of building a Catholic university. He opened a series of minor seminaries for students of limited financial means called alumnates.

In 1870 d'Alzon returned to Rome, where he fought for the declaration of the doctrine of papal infallibility. Throughout his life he was an ardent and indefatigable supporter of the papacy which he considered to be "the guarantor of Church unity". In Paris he established an organization called the Association of Our Lady of Salvation (Notre Dame de Salut) from which would spring two great Assumptionist fields of apostolic involvement:
large scale pilgrimages within France (e.g. Lourdes) and outside France (Rome and the Holy Land) and
the Bonne Presse (now known as Bayard Presse), an influential publication house.
He understood these latter endeavors to be "education in its various forms".

D'Alzon died in Nìmes. Pope John Paul II declared him "venerable" in 1991.Sometime after his death, a group of schools in France was named after him.Among them is a school in the south of France, in Vestric-et-Candiac, Occitanie. It is called Institut Emmanuel D’Alzon, and is attended by more than 500 students.

The library at Assumption University (Worcester), Massachusetts is named for Emmanuel d'Alzon.

See also

 Listing of the works of Alexandre Falguière

Notes

Further reading
Bernoville, Gaétan; Emmanuel D'Alzon, 2003, Bayard, Inc.  
Guissard, Lucien; The Assumptionists: From Past to Present, Bayard, Inc., 2002  
Sève, André ; Christ Is My Life: The Spiritual Legacy of Emmanuel d'Alzon, New City Press, 1988, 
Tavard, George; "Emmanuel d'Alzon," New Catholic Encyclopedia, 1967

1810 births
1880 deaths
People from Le Vigan, Gard
Assumptionists
Collège Stanislas de Paris alumni
Venerated Catholics by Pope John Paul II